The Battle of Sarno or the Sarno may refer to either of:

 Battle of the Sarno in 553, between the Byzantine forces under Narses and the Goths under King Teias
 Battle of the Sarno in 1460, between rebel nobles under John d'Anjou and King Ferdinand of Naples